WR 20a is an eclipsing binary star belonging to or recently (0.5 millions years before present) ejected from the young, massive cluster Westerlund 2. It was discovered in 2004 to be one of the most massive binary systems known, for which the masses of the components have been accurately measured.

Each star in the system has about eighty times the mass of the Sun. It is not clear why this system is located away from the center of the cluster. It is possible that the system was formed in the core, but that it was ejected by dynamical interactions.

Every 3.6 days the two stars in this system revolve around each other.  Although the stars are in a very tight orbit, both stars in the system are detached.  The two stars eclipse each other on each orbit, producing a drop in brightness of about 0.4 magnitudes.  The brightness is also continuously variable outside the eclipses due to the distorted shapes of the two stars.  The primary and secondary minima are almost the same depth since the size and temperature of each star is almost identical.

It is expected that within a million years the two will expand and come into contact. A large nitrogen abundance has been measured on the surface of the stars, about six times the abundance of nitrogen measured in the sun.  This nitrogen is probably produced in deeper layers of the star and pushed towards the surface by rotational mixing.

A collision between the two winds of the systems has been detected in the visible as well as in X-rays. The X-ray emitting region is quite extended since it does not suffer from any eclipse.

References

Wolf–Rayet stars
Beta Lyrae variables
Carina (constellation)
J10235800-5745489
Carinae, V712
Spectroscopic binaries
O-type supergiants